The 2012 UNAF U-17 Tournament was the ninth edition of the UNAF U-17 Tournament. The tournament took place in Kalâa Kebira, Tunisia, on March 20–24, 2012. Algeria won the competition after finishing first in the round robin stage.

Participants

 (invited)

Tournament

Champions

Scorers
2 goals
 Rezki Hamroune

1 goal
 Mohamed Falkore
 Moussa Malaynine
 Firas Msakni

References

2012 in African football
2012
2012
2011–12 in Algerian football
2011–12 in Tunisian football